Poor Georgie is the second single from hip-hop artist MC Lyte's third album Act Like You Know (1991). The song was produced by Ivan 'Doc' Rodriguez, and released on December 12, 1991. The song seeks to convey an anti-addiction message, through the story of George and the dysfunctional relationship MC Lyte has with this individual with self-destructive behaviors.

Poor Georgie become Lyte's first appearance on the Billboard Hot 100, peaking at  83 in March 1992. The song also peaked at  11 on the Billboard's Hot R&B Singles and became her second song at  1 on the Hot Rap Singles chart.

Conception and composition 
During an interview with Vibe in 2011 Lyte stated on the composition of the song:

During another interview in 2013 she says:

The song was produced by Ivan 'Doc' Rodríguez, who had previously worked remixed other songs by MC Lyte, including Cappucino.

The music video for "Poor Georgie" was released in September 1991 and features an appearance by 16-year-old Lauryn Hill.

Samples 
The song contains multi-element samples from Toto's "Georgy Porgy", vocals from The Supremes' "My World Is Empty Without You", Michael Jackson's "I Wanna Be Where You Are", Jimmy Spicer's "The Bubble Bunch" hook. The song also samples the drums from Eric B. & Rakim's "Eric B. Is President". Additionally, MC Lyte interpolates "Just Be Good to Me" from the S.O.S. Band, from the second verse ("I don't care about the other girls, just be good to me!").

Appearances
"Poor Georgie" was included the compilation albums The Very Best of MC Lyte (2001), The Shit I Never Dropped (2003), Rhyme Masters (2005), Rhino Hi-Five: MC Lyte (2007), and Cold Rock a Party - Best Of MC Lyte (2019).

In February 1992, Lyte performed the song on the dance and music show Soul Train. In May 1992, she performed the song on In Living Color.

Reception and influence
Gil Griffin of The Washington Post highlighted the song in the album review, commenting that it "brilliantly incorporates an old Toto sample." In 1999, Ego Trips editors ranked "Poor Georgie" at  22 in their list of Hip Hop's 40 Greatest Singles by Year 1991 in Ego Trip's Book of Rap Lists. In April 2015, the song was ranked  3 on VH1's list "The 25 Dopest Female Rap Tracks Of The Last 25 Years", noting that "Lyte’s cautionary tale of drunk driving once again proved that you could make folks dance and think at the same damn time."

In a conversation about her influences, Grammy-nominated rapper Rapsody mentioned Poor Georgie as "the first song that made me wanna be a part of it."

Accolades

Single track listing

7" Vinyl

A-Side
 "Poor Georgie" (4:10)
Music By – DJ Doc

B-Side
 "Search 4 The Lyte" (3:21)
Music By – King Of Chill

12" Vinyl

A-Side
 "Poor Georgie (LP Version)" (4:30)
 "Poor Georgie (Instrumental)" (4:30)

B-Side
 "Search 4 The Lyte (LP Version)" (3:21)
 "Search 4 The Lyte (Instrumental)" (3:21)

Cassette

A-1
 "Poor Georgie (Edit)" (4:05)

A-2
 "Search 4 The Lyte (LP Version)" (3:21)

Personnel
Credits are taken from the liner notes.
Engineer – Ivan "Doc" Rodriguez (tracks: A1, A2), Yorum Vazan (tracks: B1, B2)
Lyrics By – MC Lyte
Producer – King Of Chill (tracks: B1, B2)
Producer, Mixed By – Dee Jay Doc (tracks: A1, A2)

Charts

See also
 List of Billboard number-one rap singles of the 1980s and 1990s

References

MC Lyte songs
1991 singles
1991 songs
Atlantic Records singles
Songs about driving under the influence
Songs written by MC Lyte
Songs written by David Paich